Andrzej Leszczyński (1608–1658), of Wieniawa coat of arms, was a Polish–Lithuanian Commonwealth noble and priest.

Biography 
He was the son of Wacław Leszczyński. He became a priest in 1633. Chancellor of queen Cecylia Renata from 1636. Bishop of Kamieniec from 1640. Deputy Chancellor of the Crown from 1645. Bishop of Chełmno from 1646. Grand Chancellor of the Crown from 1650. Archbishop of Gniezno and primate of Poland from 1653 to 1658.

He was Abbot of Czerwińsk from 1642 to 1644 and Abbot of the Benedictine abbey in Tyniec from 1644 to 1646.

References

External links

 Biography
Picture
 Virtual tour Gniezno Cathedral 
List of Primates of Poland 

Ecclesiastical senators of the Polish–Lithuanian Commonwealth
1608 births
1658 deaths
Andrzej
Archbishops of Gniezno
17th-century Roman Catholic archbishops in the Polish–Lithuanian Commonwealth
Abbots of Czerwińsk
Abbots of Tyniec
Crown Vice-Chancellors